The Scarlet Fig: or, Slowly through a Land of Stone, is a fantasy novel written by American writer Avram Davidson, edited by Grania Davis and Henry Wessells, published in hardcover by Rose Press in 2005. An ebook edition was published by Prologue Press in August 2012.

It is the third and final novel of the author's Vergil Magus sequence, following The Phoenix and the Mirror (1969) and Vergil in Averno (1987). It follows Vergil's adventures in an alternate ancient Mediterranean world where harpies, basilisks, and satyrs co-exist with Rome, Carthage, and the Punic Wars. The books are not written in chronological order, and in fact the second and third are prequels to the first.

Notes

External links 
 

Novels by Avram Davidson
2005 American novels
2005 fantasy novels
American science fiction novels